Ankyrin repeat domain 11 is a protein that in humans is encoded by the ANKRD11 gene.

Function

This locus encodes an ankyrin repeat domain-containing protein. The encoded protein inhibits ligand-dependent activation of transcription. Mutations in this gene have been associated with KBG syndrome, which is characterized by macrodontia, distinctive craniofacial features, short stature, skeletal anomalies, global developmental delay, seizures and intellectual disability. Alternatively spliced transcript variants have been described. Related pseudogenes exist on chromosomes 2 and X.

References

Further reading